Harold Horton Sheldon  (April 13, 1893 – December 23, 1964) was a Canadian-American physicist, scientist, inventor, teacher, editor and author. He was a science editor who wrote on futuristic subjects, especially pertaining to human space travel.

Early life 
Sheldon was born on April 13, 1893, and raised in Brockville, Ontario. His parents were Harvey Sheldon and Mary Christian (Laqeau) Sheldon. The Sheldons immigrated to the United States in 1917.

Education 
Sheldon attended Queen's University in Kingston, Ontario where he received his Bachelor of Arts degree in 1916 and Master of Arts degree in 1917. He received his Ph.D. in 1920 from the University of Chicago and was an assistant professor of physics there 1918 and 1919. He later attended Brooklyn Polytechnic Institute in New York City and received a degree in electrical engineering in 1934.

Career 
Sheldon became a physics instructor at the University of Michigan in 1922. He served as science editor of The New York Herald-Tribune from 1927 to 1931. He was a professor at New York University from 1927 to 1941 and Dean at University of Miami from 1946 to 1953. The 1927–1928 New York University Bulletin lists Sheldon as a professor of Physics and includes his education: A.B. 1916, A.M. 1917, Queens; PhD 1920, Chicago. The 1940–41 Bulletin lists him as "Professor of Physics and Administrative Assistant in Charge of Science Programs, Division of General Education", and includes an additional degree: E.E. 1934 Polytechnic Institute of Brooklyn.  In the intervening years he also served as Administrative Chairman of the Physics Department.

Sheldon became a professor at Roosevelt University in 1956. He was eventually promoted by president Edward J. Sparling and  became the chairman of the physics department. In the 1960s he was the acting dean of faculties and a vice president of the university until his death. He was science editor of The New York Herald Tribune from 1928 to 1931. For the Tribune he wrote on futuristic subjects, that ultimately became matters of scientific interest to the general public.  Likewise, he was the Prentice-Hall science editor.

He is considered a pioneer in several twentieth-century scientific fields, and was a specialist in several areas of electronics. One is the conduction of electricity through crystals, which is the basic concept of modern-day electronic integrated circuits. Another was the field of ultra‐high‐radio frequencies.

During World War II (1940–46), Sheldon was an independent research and development engineer. He was named research professor of engineering at the University of Miami after the war. In the early 1950s he was a consultant to several industries, companies,  and conglomerates, including:  American Electric Power, the Organisation for European Economic Co-operation (1954–56) and the Office of Saline Water of the United States Department of the Interior.

He was a fellow of at least four professional societies: American Association for the Advancement of Science; American Society of Mechanical Engineering; American Physical Society, and the Acoustical Society of America.

Space travel 
Sheldon was a scientist who was ahead of his time, especially in space travel notions.<ref name=PreludeSpaceAge>{{Citation |last= Winter |first=Frank H. |title=Prelude to the space age |year=1983 |publisher= The Rocket Societies, 1924–1940 |page= 76 |url=https://archive.org/stream/preludetospaceag00wint/preludetospaceag00wint_djvu.txt|quote= As science editor for The New York Tribune, Sheldon was a powerful voice in the promotion of space flight at the time. He also gave his own lectures and wrote the foreword for Lasser's book. "...Dr. H. H. Sheldon of the American Museum of Natural History added greater prestige to the book by writing a forward. |access-date=November 22, 2015 }}</ref> In 1929 he wrote about the serious possibility of man visiting other planets through the use of rockets. He wrote the original introduction to The Conquest of Space by David Lasser, the first book written in English that seriously connected rocketry with space travel and the possibility of one day man visiting other planets. Sheldon was the third Ph.D. member of the newly formed American Interplanetary Society founded in 1930 by G. Edward Pendray, David Lasser, and others.

Inventions and discoveries 

   Colorscope  
Sheldon invented a precision photoelectric colorscope measurement instrument,  more accurate than the human eye could detect. 

He was a pioneer in neon tube designs, and in the design of cold cathode rectifiers. He was also a discoverer of selective absorption of hydrogen and nitrogen in charcoals, and a co-discoverer of actino electric effect.

 Works 

 Charcoal Activation – A dissertation submitted to the faculty of the Ogden graduate school of science Ph.D. thesis (1920)
 Physics for colleges (1926)Physics for Home Study  (1928), which became an educational film.
 An Outline of Science in two volumes (1929) Television, present methods of picture transmission (1929) Space, Time and Relativity: the Einstein universe (1932) Light Waves and Their Uses(1937), which became an educational film. Fuels, Heat Distribution, Thermodynamics (1938), which became an educational film.The story of force and motion; the science of physics—our world in terms of energy, matter, and molecular attraction (1939)The Progress of science'' (1941)

Family 
Sheldon married Betty F. Walcott in 1934. She came to the United States from Canada 1917 and was naturalized in 1924.

Death 
Sheldon died on December 23, 1964, at Louis A. Weiss Memorial Hospital in Chicago at the age of 71.

References

Sources 

1893 births
1964 deaths
People from Brockville
University of Chicago faculty
Polytechnic Institute of New York University alumni
20th-century American physicists
University of Michigan faculty
20th-century American inventors
Canadian emigrants to the United States